Limburg Abbey is a ruined abbey near Bad Dürkheim, at the edge of the Palatinate Forest in Germany. In the 9th century, the Salian Dukes from Worms built a fortress on the Linthberg as their family seat. In the early 11th century, the fortress was converted into a monastery with a basilica. It existed until the mid 16th century.

Burials

Gunhilda of Denmark

Benedictine monasteries in Germany
Christian monasteries established in the 11th century
Monasteries in Rhineland-Palatinate
Ruined abbeys and monasteries
Ruins in Germany